His Dog is a 1927 American silent drama film directed by Karl Brown for DeMille Pictures Corporation. It stars Joseph Schildkraut and Julia Faye in one of her rare leading roles. A complete print of the film exists at the Cinematheque Royale de Belgique in Brussels, Belgium.

Cast
Joseph Schildkraut as Peter Olsen
Julia Faye as Dorcas
Crauford Kent as Mr. Gault
Sally Rand as Marian Gault
Robert Edeson as Colonel Marsden
Annabelle Magnus as Olive
Fred Walton as Chatham

References

External links

1927 films
1927 drama films
Silent American drama films
American silent feature films
American black-and-white films
Pathé Exchange films
Films directed by Karl Brown
1920s American films